David Dror Ben-Zvi is an American mathematician, currently the Joe B. and Louise Cook Professor of Mathematics at University of Texas at Austin.

Ben-Zvi earned his Ph.D. from Harvard University in 1999, with a dissertation entitled Spectral Curves, Opers And Integrable Systems supervised by Edward Frenkel.
In 2012, he became one of the inaugural Fellows of the American Mathematical Society.

References

Year of birth missing (living people)
Living people
University of Texas at Austin faculty
21st-century American mathematicians
Fellows of the American Mathematical Society
Harvard Graduate School of Arts and Sciences alumni